Platyprosopa is a genus of moths of the family Noctuidae.

Species
 Platyprosopa nigrostrigata (Bethune-Baker, 1906)

References
Natural History Museum Lepidoptera genus database
Platyprosopa at funet

Hadeninae